Raga Airport is an airport serving the town of Raga in South Sudan.

Location
Raga Airport is located in the town of Raga in Lol State near the international borders with the Central African Republic and the Republic of Sudan. The airport is located southwest of the central business district of the town.

The geographic coordinates of this airport are: 8° 27' 54.00"N, 25° 40' 48.00"E (Latitude: 8.4650; Longitude: 25.6800). The airport has a single unpaved runway, the dimensions of which are not publicly known at this time.

Services
Raga Airport is a small civilian airport that serves the town of Raga and surrounding communities. There are no known scheduled airlines serving Raga Airport at this time.

External links
Location of Raga Airport At Google Maps

See also
 Raga, South Sudan
 Western Bahr el Ghazal
 List of airports in South Sudan

References

Airports in South Sudan
Western Bahr el Ghazal
Bahr el Ghazal